Jatiya Samajtantrik Dal may refer to:

 Jatiya Samajtantrik Dal (JASAD)- Political party in Bangladesh.
 Jatiya Samajtantrik Dal-JSD- Bangladeshi political party.
 Jatiya Samajtantrik Dal (Siraj)- Bangladeshi political party.